The Hialeah Turf Cup Handicap is a discontinued American Thoroughbred horse race open to horses aged three and older that was run each year at Hialeah Park Race Track in Hialeah, Florida until the track closed at the end of the 2001 racing season. At the time, it was the oldest grass race in America.

The race was inaugurated as the Miami Cup Handicap ion March 13, 1926 and was open to horses age three and older. In addition to the President's gold cup, winner Boon Companion received what at the time was a very sizeable winner's purse of $24,950. From 1929 through 1952 it was run as the Miami Beach Handicap then in 1953 was renamed the Hialeah Turf Cup Handicap.  The race was run on dirt until 1939 when it was permanently moved to the turf. It was a Grade 1 event in 1989 when financial difficulties saw racing at Hialeah Park suspended. On resumption in 1992, the race lost its graded stakes status.

Run in two divisions in 1944, the race was contested at different distances:
 1 mile – 1932–1938
 1 mile, 70 yards – 1929–1931 
  miles –  1926, 1939–1944
  miles – 1927
  miles – 1995–1999, 2001
  miles – 1946
  miles – 2000
  miles – 1947–1994

Records
Speed  record:
 2:25.40 @ 1 miles – El Senor (1989)

Most wins:
 2 – Gleaming (1972, 1973)
 2 – Nijinsky's Secret (1983, 1984)

Most wins by an owner:
 3 – Allen E. Paulson (1987, 1998, 2001)
 3 – Calumet Farm (1966, 1972, 1973)
 3 – Hasty House Farm (1955, 1962, 1964)

Most wins by a jockey:
 3 – Ángel Cordero Jr. (1972, 1973, 1979)

Most wins by a trainer:
 3 – Harry Trotsek (1955, 1962, 1964)

Winners

References

Graded stakes races in the United States
Discontinued horse races
1926 establishments in Florida
Horse racing in Florida
Hialeah Park
Widener family
2001 disestablishments in Florida
Recurring sporting events established in 1926
Recurring sporting events disestablished in 2001